Hauteville-la-Guichard is a commune in the Manche department in Normandy in north-western France (population: 425 in 2006).

It is thought to be the original stronghold of the Hauteville family who made their fortunes in southern Italy and Sicily as the Norman kings of Sicily, beginning with the modest Norman seigneur Tancred of Hauteville, who is commemorated by a simple exhibit housed in the former presbytère.

Origins

The Hauteville family is said to descend from Hiallt, a Norseman who is said to have settled in the Cotentin and founded the village of Hialtus Villa (Hauteville, likely Hjalt(i)vik in Norse) in 920, the later family's toponym coming from this town. From just which village of Hauteville the family drew its name is hard to identify with certainty, though modern scholarship favours Hauteville-la-Guichard.

See also
Communes of the Manche department

References

External links

Musée Tancred de Hauteville
Hauteville-la-Guichard: official website (French)

Communes of Manche
Havill family